Archibald McDonald Fraser (6 June 1896 – 30 August 1979) was an Australian politician.

He was born in Charters Towers to engine driver Archibald Gibson Fraser and Julia Riordan. He grew up in Kalgoorlie and was educated in Perth, receiving a Bachelor of Arts from the University of Western Australia. He subsequently studied at the University of Melbourne, where he received a Bachelor of Law. He was a barrister from 1921. On 18 December 1924 he married Gertrude Mary Prendergast, with whom he had five children. He had joined the Labor Party in 1923, and in 1940 was elected to the Victorian Legislative Council for Melbourne North Province. From 1945 to 1947 he was Assistant Minister of Lands and Water Supply, and from 1952 to 1954 he was Minister of Labour and Mines. In 1954 he resigned from parliament to become a judge on the County Court and chairman of the Victorian Licensing Court. He retired in 1968 and died at South Yarra in 1979. His son Neale Fraser was a tennis player.

References

1896 births
1979 deaths
Australian Labor Party members of the Parliament of Victoria
Members of the Victorian Legislative Council
20th-century Australian politicians
University of Western Australia alumni
People educated at Christian Brothers' College, Perth